Georges Bronchard (21 January 1887 – 27 April 1918) was a French racing cyclist. He finished in last place in the 1906 Tour de France. He was killed during World War I.

References

External links
 

1887 births
1918 deaths
French male cyclists
French military personnel killed in World War I
Sportspeople from Seine-et-Marne
Cyclists from Île-de-France